Fort Nassau  was the first Dutch settlement in North America, located beside the "North River" (the modern Hudson) within present-day Albany, New York, in the United States. The factorij was a small fortification which served as a trading post and warehouse.

History
Henry Hudson explored what would be known as the Hudson River for the Dutch in 1609, including Castle Island which was at the center of Native American fur trading routes from the interior. Hendrick Christiaensen chose Castle Island to build Fort Nassau, in 1614 or 1615 as a dual warehouse and military defense structure and named the fort in honor of the stadtholder of the United Netherlands, who was of the House of Orange-Nassau. Nineteenth and early-twentieth century historians claimed that around 1540, French fur traders built a stone "castle" or fortified trading post on Castle Island in the location where Fort Nassau was later built. However, modern scholars have found no evidence to support this claim. Fort Nassau was the first Dutch settlement in North America. Jacob Eelkens became commander on Christiaensen's death in 1616.

In 1617 a freshet damaged the fort to such an extent that it was abandoned and rebuilt on more secure ground at the mouth of the Normans Kill (called the Tawasentha by the natives) with the Hudson River. This new fortification was built by Eelkens on a prominence called Tawass-gunshee by the natives. Once the new fort was completed, the Dutch completed their first treaty with natives of North America. In 1618 a freshet destroyed the new fort, and it was abandoned for good.

In 1624, the Dutch built Fort Orange nearby.

Geography
Fort Nassau was built on what is now called Westerlo Island and was formerly called Castle Island. The island was part of the town of Bethlehem until 1926 when it was annexed to the city of Albany.  It has been part of the Port of Albany-Rensselaer since 1932.

Structure
The fort was defended by two large cannon and eleven swivel guns. The fort was garrisoned by 10-12 men.

See also
Two Row Wampum Treaty
Fort Nassau (South River)
Fortifications of New Netherland
History of Albany, New York
New Netherland settlements

References

External links
The Trading House 1615 Artist Len Tantillo's vision of what Fort Nassau may have looked like

Nassau
Nassau
1614 establishments in the Dutch Empire
History of Albany, New York
Dutch-American culture in New York (state)